There are many listed buildings in Cardiff Bay, part of Cardiff, capital city of Wales. A listed building is one considered to be of special architectural, historical or cultural significance, and has restrictions on amendments or demolition. Buildings are listed as either Grade I, II* and II buildings lists, with the Grade I being the most important.

Cardiff Bay describes the redeveloped docklands area of the city, including the neighbourhoods of Butetown and Atlantic Wharf, previously better known as Tiger Bay. It is bounded approximately by the River Taff to the west, the Bute East Dock to the east and the mainline railway to the north.

Key

Grade I and II* listed buildings

Grade II listed buildings

See also
 Listed buildings in Cardiff
 Architecture of Cardiff

Sources
 Butetown, Cardiff, BritishListedBuildings.co.uk
 Mount Stuart Square: Conservation Area Appraisal (PDF), Strategic Planning & Environment, Cardiff Council (2009)
 Royal Commission on the Ancient and Historical Monuments of Wales (RCAHMW) website listings

References

Cardiff-related lists
Listed buildings in Cardiff
Butetown
Cardiff Bay